Jordan Clark (born 16 October 2000) is a professional Australian rules footballer playing for the Fremantle Football Club in the Australian Football League (AFL), having been initially drafted to the Geelong Football Club.

Early life
Clark was raised in Albany, Western Australia where he played for the Railways Football Club.  At 17 he moved to Perth to attend Guildford Grammar School and played colts for the Claremont Football Club. He was selected 15th overall in the 2018 AFL draft by the Geelong Football Club.

Cricket career 
Clark was a talented sportsman as a junior. In January 2017, he represented the Australian under-16 national cricket team in their One Day International series against Pakistan in Dubai, taking a hat-trick in the third match.

AFL career
Clark made his debut in Round 1 of the 2019 AFL season against Collingwood, having 17 disposals.

Clark was traded to Fremantle at the end of the 2021 AFL season.

Clark made his debut for Fremantle in Round 1 of the 2022 AFL season against , kicking a goal. Clark played his 50th game during round 19 against . Clark finished his first season at Fremantle having played every game and averaging a career-high 21.3 disposals.

Statistics
 Statistics are correct to the end of round 10, 2022

|- style="background-color: #EAEAEA"
! scope="row" style="text-align:center" | 2019
|
| 6 || 18 || 11 || 8 || 171 || 78 || 249 || 76 || 48 || 0.6 || 0.4 || 9.5 || 4.3 || 13.8 || 4.2 || 2.7
|-
! scope="row" style="text-align:center" | 2020
|
| 6 || 3 || 1 || 1 || 24 || 14 || 38 || 12 || 9 || 0.3 || 0.3 || 8.0 || 4.7 || 12.7 || 4.0 || 3.0
|- style="background-color: #EAEAEA"
! scope="row" style="text-align:center" | 2021
|
| 6 || 11 || 3 || 2 || 61 || 52 || 113 || 26 || 22 || 0.3 || 0.2 || 5.6 || 4.7 || 10.3 || 2.4 || 2.0
|-
! scope="row" style="text-align:center" | 2022
|
| 6 || 10 || 2 || 1 || 122 || 82 || 204 || 46 || 29 || 0.2 || 0.1 || 12.2 || 8.2 || 20.4 || 4.6 || 2.9 
|- class="sortbottom"
! colspan=3| Career
! 42
! 17
! 12
! 378
! 226	
! 604
! 160
! 108
! 0.4
! 0.3
! 9.0
! 5.4
! 14.4
! 3.8
! 2.6
|}

Notes

References

External links

2000 births
Living people
Geelong Football Club players
Claremont Football Club players
Australian rules footballers from Western Australia
Fremantle Football Club players